Quartz is a former settlement in Butte County, California. It lay at an elevation of 262 feet (80 m).  It still appeared on maps as of 1947. The townsite has been flooded by the Lake Oroville reservoir since 1968.

References

External links

Former settlements in Butte County, California
Former populated places in California